Sixth College is the sixth and second-newest college of the University of California, San Diego. It was established in September 2001. Sixth College's core writing program, Culture, Art and Technology (CAT), is a five-course sequence that integrates writing skills into multidisciplinary classes to examine the intersections of culture, art, and technology.

Name

Sixth College is so named because it is the sixth undergraduate college at UCSD. As per university tradition, it uses a numerical name until it gets a proper name, which will occur in the order that the colleges are created. The names of prominent persons who fit the college's theme of Culture, Art, and Technology, such as Thomas Edison, Benjamin Franklin, Leonardo da Vinci, and Chester Cesolini, have been proposed by students but never seriously considered by the administration. The naming process has been stopped indefinitely.

Ethos and philosophy

Sixth College prepares students to become effective global citizens who engage creatively and ethically with the  complex issues facing the world in the 21st century.  Through the college's academic and co-curricular programs, students learn to become innovative, aware, and interconnected.  The college draws its creative inspiration through the interdisciplinary examination of culture, art and technology.  Core academic programs develop skills in both traditional and emergent media literacy, emphasizing essential writing fundamentals as well as the latest forms of digital communication.

The core sequence in Culture, Art and Technology develops students' abilities to explore the richness of intellectual and academic multiplicity, write effectively, ask and examine difficult questions, work with multiple media and sensory experiences, collaborate in teams, consider ethical issues, develop digital literacy, and explore art and technology in a cultural context.

Extending beyond the classroom, Sixth College educates the student as a whole person. The college community understands the importance of student life in education, and works to integrate academic development with personal growth, community service, interpersonal experience, conscious communication, and ethical behavior.  The totality of Sixth College is a digital educational ecology that fosters new forms of thought, expression and community for a new millennium.

Experiential learning

Sixth College is committed to experiential learning on many different levels.

The Practicum is a unique upper-division requirement that promotes civic engagement and global consciousness, and embodies the college's commitment to active, experiential learning. It is designed to assist students in preparing their professional portfolios and refining their presentation skills as they prepare to enter the post-graduate world.

Beginning in 2012, Sixth College has hosted the biannual Experiential Learning Conference. Sixth College is also the only college at UC San Diego with an explicit upper division Practicum requirement which can be satisfied by many different types of experiential learning opportunities including: study abroad programs, study at UCDC, various types of service-learning in the community, directed research with faculty members, internship programs, and specially-designed independent study programs.

The paramount aim is to provide a learning community that is nurturing and stimulating, while equipping students to face the challenges that lie ahead.

General education

In addition to the Culture, Art, and Technology (CAT) core writing program, all Sixth College students are required to take on an upper division Practicum course, unique to all the colleges at UCSD. The program requires students to enroll in courses that demand a hands-on approach to education while making valuable contributions to communities both locally and abroad. Students must choose a 4-unit course, program, internship, or research opportunity for their Practicum Project that develops both their academic and professional skills.

Along with the Practicum, every student is required to complete Sixth College's upper-division writing course, CAT 125. This course gives students the opportunity to reflect upon the relationship between their service and their coursework, and to increase their mastery of the written and spoken word.

Student life

The student council at Sixth College is known as SCSC. This Sixth College Student Council heads the many committees that are responsible for many major Sixth events in the academic year. These include Spirit of the Masters (Arts Committee), CHAOS (Culture Committee), Kuncocshun (Festival Committee), Winter Game Fest (Tech Committee), and Spirit Night (Spirit Committee). The SCSC also has positions for members of the Sixth College Judicial Board.

Other student organizations include Action Vibe, Community Board (Co-Board), Sixth College Television (SCTV), The Sixth Sense (an investigative journal), Sixer Tritons and Recreation for Transfers (START), and Video Production Club (VPC). Sixth College also has an ambassador program, for students who strive to increase Sixth College students' sense of belonging and connectedness to the community.

Sixth College's dining hall is known as Foodworx. Sixth Place and Market, a convenience store, is located nearby.

On-campus housing

On-campus housing is available at Sixth College for two years. The original Sixth College dormitories are located near Pepper Canyon Hall, and are now used for transfer student housing. These dorms are nicknamed "Camp Snoopy" as the trees, central lawn, and cabin-like dormitory buildings all contribute to the appearance of a youth summer camp. The dorms are arranged in multiple two-story buildings, with approximately sixty students per building (thirty per floor). Each floor is further divided into two suites, each consisting of five rooms and a common room. A shared bathroom connects the two suites. Each building also features a kitchen and study room for use by residents of that building.

The other former on-campus housing option are the old Sixth's apartments (sometimes referred to by their old name from when they were part of Fifth College, "Pepper Canyon Apartments").

Sixth College has begun transitioning to new facilities in a different part of campus, the North Torrey Pines Living and Learning Neighborhood. The transition process has been staggered due to the COVID-19 pandemic, with some students living in the completed facilities, and the remaining buildings expected to finish construction by 2020 or early 2021.

Housing is available exclusively for black students at the African Black Diaspora Living-Learning Community at Sixth College.

As of 2021, students at Sixth College now live at the North Torrey Pines living & learning community.

Commuter life

Sixth College has several resources for commuters. Sixth College commuter students have unlimited access to the Commuter Center located in Pepper Canyon Hall, which features lockers, WiFi, and kitchen facilities. Sixth College also has a commuter student organization known as Commuters in Action, or CIA. Each quarter, Sixth College also hosts Commuter and Transfer social events.

Notable events

On April 20, 2012, late-night talk show host Conan O'Brien visited Sixth College in honor of its tenth anniversary. To celebrate the occasion, and in the absence of a permanent name, Sixth College renamed itself to Conan O'Brien College for the day of April 20.

On May 27, 2015, actress Mayim Bialik visited Sixth College in honor of its thirteenth anniversary.

Experiential Learning Conference
The Experiential Learning Conference is a biannual event occurring in early Winter quarter (late January), and is free and open to the public. The first conference was organizers by former acting Provost Jim Lin and Director Diane Forbes Berthoud, and hosted jointly by Sixth College and Warren College on January 26, 2012, in the Cross Cultural Center located in Price Center East. The theme of the inaugural conference was Education in Action: Mobilizing the next generation for social reform. Over 165 presenters participated in panels, with representation from multiple universities in San Diego and across the UC Community. Notable presenters included David Kirsh, Lev Manovich, High Tech High, Gompers Preparatory Academy.

The second conference was sponsored by Provost Dan Donoghue, organized by  Director Diane Forbes Berthoud, and hosted by Sixth College. The event was held in Price Center West as well as the Cross Cultural Center on Friday, January 31, 2014.

The keynote speaker was Mizuko Ito, who gave a special noon session talk on 'Connected Learning.' Other notable presenters included Associate Vice Chancellor Barbara Sawrey, Michael Trigilio, STEM and STEAM programming, Elizabeth Losh, K. Wayne Yang, Teddy Cruz, Bud Mehan, Michael Cole, Ashley Trinh, and Mirle Bussell.

The third conference was sponsored by Provost Dan Donoghue, organized by Director Diane Forbes Berthoud, and hosted by Sixth College. The event was held in the Cross Cultural Center on Thursday, March 31, 2016.

Commencement
UC San Diego hosts separate graduation ceremonies for each undergraduate college. Sixth College has had such commencement speakers as:
 Sev Ohanian, '08 Sixth alum, co-writer/producer of Searching
 Wesley Chan, '06 Sixth alum, member of Wong Fu Productions
 Kim Stanley Robinson, science fiction writer
 Naomi Oreskes, history professor and co-author of Merchants of Doubt

References

External links 
 Official Sixth College website
 Overview of UCSD's College System
 Sixth College Culture, Art, and Technology website
UC San Diego College System
UC San Diego College Comparison

University of California, San Diego
Educational institutions established in 2001
2001 establishments in California